Bacolet, Grenada is a town in the south-east of Grenada, Caribbean. It is also referred to as Baillies Bacolet. It is located in the Parish of Saint David.

References

External links 
Map with Bacelot, Grenada

Populated places in Grenada